Hsieh Su-wei was the defending champion, but chose to participate in Istanbul instead.

Wang Qiang won the title, defeating Mayo Hibi in the final, 6–2, 6–0.

Seeds

Main draw

Finals

Top half

Bottom half

References 
 Main draw

Shenzhen - Singles
Pingshan Open